Hadibowo Susanto (4 July 1958 – 7 June 2011) was a badminton player from Indonesia.

Career
A men's doubles specialist, Hadibowo teamed with veteran doubles maestro Christian Hadinata to win the Indonesia and Thailand Opens in 1984. In the 1984 Thomas Cup (men's international team championship) series, Hadibowo and Christian defeated their final round Chinese opponents, contributing to Indonesia's three matches to two victory. They also won their final round match against China in the 1986 Thomas Cup series, but this time in a two matches to three loss.

Achievements

World Cup 
Men's doubles

Southeast Asian Games 
Men's doubles

International Tournaments 

The World Badminton Grand Prix has been sanctioned by the International Badminton Federation from 1983 to 2006.

Men's doubles

References

1958 births
2011 deaths
Indonesian male badminton players
Asian Games medalists in badminton
Badminton players at the 1986 Asian Games
Asian Games bronze medalists for Indonesia
Medalists at the 1986 Asian Games
People from Tegal
Sportspeople from Central Java
20th-century Indonesian people
21st-century Indonesian people